The Thirteenth Hour is a 1947 American mystery film noir based on the radio drama The Whistler.  Directed by William Clemens, the production features Richard Dix, Karen Morley and John Kellogg.  It is the seventh of Columbia Pictures' eight "Whistler" films produced in the 1940s. This was the last of Dix's seven starring roles in the series, and one of only two that featured him in a sympathetic light. Suffering from heart disease, Dix was unable to continue his acting career and died in September 1949 at the age of 56.

Premise
A truck driver named Steve Reynolds (Richard Dix) is involved in a nasty business rivalry.  He gets assaulted by a masked bandit who hijacks his truck.

Cast
 Richard Dix as Steve Reynolds
 Karen Morley as Eileen Blair
 John Kellogg as Charlie Cook
 Jim Bannon as Jerry Mason
 Regis Toomey as Don Parker
 Bernadene Hayes as Mabel Sands
 Mark Dennis as Tommy Blair

References

External links
 
 
 
 
 The Thirteenth Hour informational page at the Richard Dix web page

1947 films
1947 mystery films
American mystery films
American black-and-white films
Columbia Pictures films
Film noir
Films based on radio series
The Whistler films
1940s English-language films
1940s American films